Thalaimuraigal is a 2013 Tamil-language film written, cinematography, edited, and directed by Balu Mahendra in his last directorial film. Produced by Sasikumar's Company Productions and Balu Mahendra's Cinema Pattarai, the film has Master Karthik, Balu Mahendra, Sashikumar Subramani, Ramya Shankar, and Vinodhini Vaidyanathan , while Sasikumar appears in a cameo appearance. The film's score was composed by Ilaiyaraaja. At the 61st National Film Awards, the film won the Nargis Dutt Award for Best Feature Film on National Integration.

Cast
 Master Karthik as Aditya
 Balu Mahendra as Subbu
 Sashikumar Subramani as Sivaraman
 Ramya Shankar as Stella
 Vinodhini Vaidyanathan as Sivaraman's sister
 Sasikumar as Dr. Adithya (cameo)
Pasi Sathya

Production
Four years after his last directional venture Adhu Oru Kanakaalam, Balu Mahendra announced a project called Anal Kaatru in 2008, but the project was dropped due to unknown reasons. In 2013, he announced that he would direct Thalaimuraigal. The film was made in 50 days on a shoestring budget of under ₹1 crore (worth ₹1.9 crore in 2021 prices). Apart from directing, Balu Mahendra revealed that he would play a pivotal role in the film. Besides, Sasikumar who produced this film will appear in a cameo appearance. Ramya Shankar who appeared in the television series Saravannan Meenatchi was selected to play a mother of 10 year old. Master Karthik, who earlier appeared in Ethir Neechal, was selected as the child artist. Sasi, who earlier appeared in Sashikumar Subramani's television series Kathai Neram and also played the roles of Rambha's brother in Anandham and Atul Kulkarni's brother in the Dhanush-starrer Padikkadavan, was selected to play an important role. Vinodhini Vaidyanathan, who acted in films like Engaeyum Eppothum and Varuthapadatha Valibar Sangam was signed to play Balu Mahendra's daughter in the film. The film was shot entirely with Canon EOS 5D, a still camera.

Critical reception
The Times of India gave 4 stars out of 5 and wrote, "there is plenty of genuineness and warmth, which, elevated by the minimalist storytelling and genteel performances turn this simple film into the feel-good film of the year". Rediff gave 3.5 stars out of 5 and wrote, "Thalaimuraigal is a heartwarming tale of a grandfather coming to terms with his own conservative values and beliefs, while at the same time instilling in his grandson, a sense of pride and appreciation in his language and culture". Behindwoods too gave 3.5 stars out of 5 and called it "an artistic piece of parallel cinema". The Hindu wrote, "If Mahendra's aim was to make a film that can compete on a global level, Thalaimuraigal is a concrete step in that direction". Sify wrote, "Thalaimuraigal is well crafted movie that strikes a chord and is a heart-warming story of a relationship between a grandfather and his grandson". Indiaglitz rated it 4.5 out of 5 and wrote, "Thalaimuraigal is an emotional, touching and beautiful film that will bring you closer to family", calling it "definitely one of Balu Mahendra's best".

Awards
 2013 – Nargis Dutt Award for Best Feature Film on National Integration

References

External links
 

2013 films
Films scored by Ilaiyaraaja
Indian drama films
Films directed by Balu Mahendra
2010s Tamil-language films
Best Film on National Integration National Film Award winners
2013 drama films